Naj is a Polish language fortnightly lifestyle and women's magazine published in Warsaw, Poland.

History and profile
Naj was started in 1994 by Gruner + Jahr company. The magazine has its headquarters in Warsaw. It was published on a weekly basis by  Gruner+Jahr Polska. Later it began to be published fortnightly. The magazine was sold to Bauer Media Group, another German company, in February 2012. Then it became a supplement of Tina, a biweekly magazine.

Naj covers articles on health, fashion and beauty.

In 1997 Naj had a circulation of about 750,000 copies. In 2010 the circulation of the magazine was 343,152 copies.

See also
 List of magazines in Poland

References

1994 establishments in Poland
Bauer Media Group
Biweekly magazines
Lifestyle magazines
Magazines established in 1994
Magazines published in Warsaw
Polish-language magazines
Weekly magazines published in Poland
Women's magazines published in Poland